Konstantin Konstantinovich Zel'in (1892 - 1983) was a Soviet Russian historian of classical antiquity, Doctor of Sciences in Historical Sciences (1963).

Biography 
He graduated from the Moscow University in 1916. He studied under Professors Robert Wipper and Dmitry Petrushevsky.

From 1926 to 1929, he was a graduate student.

Then he taught at the Institute of Red Professors.

From 1934 he was a professor at the MSU Faculty of History.
Zel'in headed the Department of History of the Ancient World.

His both dissertations are devoted to Egypt.
He published in Journal of Ancient History.

References

1892 births
1983 deaths
Soviet historians